Nanchan Temple is a Buddhist temple located near the town of Doucun on Wutaishan, Shanxi Province, China. Nanchan Temple was built in 782 during China's Tang dynasty, and its Great Buddha Hall is currently China's oldest preserved timber building extant, as wooden buildings are often prone to fire and various destruction. Not only is Nanchan Temple an important architectural site, but it also contains an original set of artistically important Tang sculptures dating from the period of its construction. Seventeen sculptures share the hall's interior space with a small stone pagoda.

History
According to an inscription on a beam, the Great Buddha Hall of Nanchan Temple was first built in 782 CE during the Tang dynasty. It escaped destruction during the Buddhist purges of 845, perhaps due to its isolated location in the mountains. Another inscription on a beam indicates that the hall was renovated in 1086 of the Song dynasty, and during that time all but four of the original square columns were replaced with round columns. In the 1950s the building was rediscovered by architectural historians, and in 1961 it was recognized as China's oldest standing timber-frame building. Just five years later in 1966, the building was damaged in an earthquake, and during the renovation period in the 1970s, historians got a chance to study the building piece by piece.

Great Buddha Hall

As the oldest extant timber-frame building in China, The Great Buddha Hall is an important building in the understanding of Chinese architectural history. The humble building is a three bay square hall that is 10 meters deep and 11.75 meters across the front. The roof is supported by twelve pillars that are implanted directly into a brick foundation. The hip-gable roof is supported by five-puzuo brackets. The hall does not contain any interior columns or a ceiling, nor are there any struts supporting the roof in between the columns. All of these features indicate that this is a low-status structure. The hall contains several features of Tang dynasty halls, including its longer central front bay, the use of camel-hump braces, and the presence of a yuetai.

Sculptures
Along with nearby Foguang Temple, Nanchan Temple contains original sculptures dating from the Tang dynasty. The hall contains seventeen statues and are lined up on an inverted U-shaped dais. The largest statue is of Sakyamuni, placed in the center of the hall sitting cross-legged on a sumeru throne adorned with sculpted images of a lion and demigod. Above the large halo behind the statue are sculpted representations of lotus flowers, celestial beings and mythical birds. Flanking him on each side are attendant Bodhisattvas with a knee placed on a lotus. A large statue of Samantabhadra riding an elephant is at the far left of the hall and a large statue of Manjusri riding a lion is on the far left. There are also statues of two of Sakyamuni's disciples (Ananda and Mahakashyapa), two statues of heavenly kings and four statues of attendants.

The Great Buddha Hall also contains one small carved stone pagoda that is five levels high. The first level is carved with a story about the Buddha, and each corner contains an additional small pagoda. Each side of the second level is carved with one large Buddha in the center, flanked with four smaller Buddhas on each side. The upper three levels have three carved Buddhas on each side.

Notes

References
 Howard, Angela Falco, et al. Chinese Sculpture. New Haven: Yale University Press, 2006. 
 Steinhardt, Nancy Shatzman. Liao Architecture. Honolulu: University of Hawaii, 1997. 
 Steinhardt, Nancy Shatzman ed. Chinese Architecture. New Haven: Yale University, 2002. 
 Steinhardt, Nancy Shatzman. "The Tang Architectural Icon and the Politics of Chinese Architectural History", The Art Bulletin (Volume 86, Number 2, 2004): 228–254.
 Zhao Yu,  ed. Shanxi. Beijing: Chinese Travel Press, 2007.

External links
Nanchan Temple, Architectura Sinica Site Archive

Buddhist temples in Xinzhou
Tang dynasty art
Tang dynasty Buddhist temples
Timber framed buildings in China
Major National Historical and Cultural Sites in Shanxi